Mohawk Airlines Flight 112 was a scheduled passenger flight from Rochester-Monroe Airport in Rochester, New York to Newark International Airport in Newark, New Jersey. On July 2, 1963, the aircraft operating the flight, a Martin 4-0-4 with a total of 15,970 operational hours, crashed during takeoff. The accident killed 7 people (2 crewmen and 5 passengers) and injured 36.

Flight 112 attempted to take off on Rochester's runway 28 into a heavy thunderstorm. The co-pilot was unable to maintain control of the aircraft, and it fell to earth two minutes after takeoff. The plane struck the ground left wing-first. It then cartwheeled wing-over-wing and caught fire.

The co-pilot, as pilot flying, had attempted to keep the plane aloft, keeping a tight grip on the controls even after recovery was impossible. The captain managed to assume control and managed to guide the plane down to save most of the passengers.

The NTSB found the cause of the accident to be the pilot's decision to take off in bad weather, and cited the weather itself as a contributing factor. The captain had initially refused to take off, but was told he would be demoted if he did not commence the flight, as he had twice previously refused to take off in bad weather.

References
 
Summary by National Transportation Safety Board
420 F.2d 115 136 U.S.App.D.C. 273 Joan S. NEFF, Administratrix of the Estate of John W. Neff v.UNITED STATES of America, Appellant. No. 22262. United States Court of Appeals District of Columbia Circuit.

External links
 1963 Mohawk Airlines Crash at Monroe County Airport Professional Firefighters

Airliner accidents and incidents caused by weather
Accidents and incidents involving the Martin 4-0-4
Airliner accidents and incidents caused by pilot error
Aviation accidents and incidents in the United States in 1963
1963 in New York (state)
Mohawk Airlines accidents and incidents
Airliner accidents and incidents in New York (state)
History of Rochester, New York
1963 meteorology
July 1963 events in the United States